Mahakaali — Anth Hi Aarambh Hai (English: Mahakali — The end marks the beginning is an Indian (Hindi language) television series that premiered on 22 July 2017 on Colors TV. The show traced the epic story of Goddess Parvati’s metamorphosis into Mahakali.
Produced by Siddharth Kumar Tewary's Swastik Productions, it starred Pooja Sharma in the titular role of Goddess Mahakali, Sourabh Raj Jain as Lord Mahadev and Kanan Malhotra as Lord Vishnu.

Plot

The show's plot revolves around the much-adored tale of Goddess Parvati, the wife of Lord Shiva (sister of Lord Vishnu) and her alter-ego, Mahakali.

Adi Parashakti, the supreme Goddess of the Universe (according to the Shakta faith) creates Brahma – the progenitor, Vishnu – the protector and Shiva – the destroyer, and their female counterparts. According to her promise to Shiva, who expressed his love to her, she takes multiple births on earth to woo and wed Him. He is entrusted with the duty of transforming the earthly incarnations of the Goddess into Mahakali but failed 107 times (of which 107th birth was of Sati). So, Adi Parashakti finally incarnates as the princess of the Himalayas and is renowned as Parvati.

With her strong will and intense devotion, Parvati becomes the wife of Shiva. However, their marriage is threatened when the demon king Shumbha (along with his brother Nishumbha) expresses his desire to marry Parvati and wages war against Shiva. In an attempt to protect all those who have taken up refuge in her home at Mount Kailash, Parvati rushes into the war, successfully channeling Goddess Mahakali, her untamed warrior side through her unbound rage. Her rampage inspires other goddesses like Lakshmi, Saraswati and Indrani to bring forth their inner warriors and fight alongside Kali.

Mahakali is able to overthrow Shumbha's tyrannical rule and slay all his associates (including famed demons like Mahishasura, Bhandasura, Tarakasura, Nishumbha, Raktabija and Chanda and Munda) in the process.

In years following her triumph, Shiva and Parvati expand their family to include their sons Lord Ganesha and Lord Kartikeya. Further stories highlight the success of the female endeavor against the patriarchal anarchy which manifests as threats like Banasura, Narakasura, Arunasura, Durgamasura, Andhak and the like – all being formidable demons famously killed by the Goddess in various incarnations. The show also highlights the importance of family sticking up for each other, as the Kailash-Parivar face multiple social challenges and deconstruct many primitive thought processes.

Cast

Main 
 Pooja Sharma as Goddess Mahakali ,Parvati (Vishnu's sister; Mahadev's Wife, Kartikeya and Ganesha's Mother) . / Kali, Chamunda, Bhadrakali / Sati : Mahadev's First Wife ./ Durga / Navadurga ( Shailaputri, Brahmacharini, Chandraghanta, Kushmanda, Skandamata, Katyayani, Kaalratri, Mahagauri, Siddhidhatri) / The Mahavidyas (Kali, Tara, Tripura Sundari, Chhinnamasta, Dhumavati, Bagalamukhi and Matangi) / Bama Kali/ Ambika /Jwala Ji/ Avanti Kali/ Chamundeshwari/Ardhanarishvara / Annapurna / Kamakhya / Bhramari / Shatakshi/ Shakambhari/ Hinglaj/ Bimala / Devi Kanya Kumari,  Matsya Parvati, Mhalsa, Shitala, Mahadevi and other incarnations of Shakti .
 Saurabh Raj Jain as Lord Shiva / Mahakaal / Rudra / Virabhadra / Bhairava / Nataraja / Jagannath / Kaal Bhairav/ Martand and other incarnations of Shiva : Sati and Parvati's Husband, Kartikeya, and Ganesha's Father.   Jalandhara 
 Kanan Malhotra as Lord Vishnu /Lord Krishna/ Mohini , Parvati's brother , Kartikeya and Ganesh's Maternal uncle; Lakshmi's husband; God of Preservation, Reality, Kala, Karma restoration and Moksha; The Protector of Good; Para Brahman, Supreme Being .                                                              He is the protector of the entire universe. Brahma is also formed by him through a lotus which grew from his navel. He helped Parvati, her sister, in her journey to marry Shiva. All the happenings of the universe, whether present or future, are known to him. He helps Parvati and Shiva whenever required. Along with Shiva and Brahma , he forms the Trimurti / Tridev. 

 Nikita Sharma as Goddess Lakshmi; Vaishnavi; Narayani; Parvati's sister in-law , Kartikeya and Ganesh's aunt. She is the goddess of wealth, fortune, power, beauty and prosperity, and associated with Maya ("Illusion"). Along with Parvati and Saraswati, she forms the Tridevi of Hindu goddesses. She helps Parvati in finding Kartikeya's Shaktipunja (when it was divided into 6). Also, she helps her to kill Shumbha as Kalaratri and during other severe situations. She was once saved by Parvati (in the form of Kamakhya) when Shiva blesses Narkasura with the power to control her. She gets encouraged from Mahakali and takes the form of Narayani /  Vaishnavi to destroy the evil. 

 Meghan Jadhav as Lord Kartikeya; god of war; Elder son of Shiva and Parvati; brother of Ganesha ; husband of Devsena and Valli
 Krish Chauhan as Lord Ganesha  : Younger son of Shiva and Parvati; Kartikeya's Younger Brother; Ridhi and Siddhi's Husband.

Recurring 

 Abhishek Avasthi as Nandi 
 Manish Bishla as Dev-Raj Indra: King of All Dev's, Shachi's Husband.
 Hitanshu Jinsi as Vayudev
 Falaq Naaz as Goddess Saraswati , Brahmani
 Debina Bonerjee / Rimpi Das as Goddess Ganga
 Himanshu Bamzai as Devantak
  Akash Kumar as Lord Brahma 
Rohit Khurana as Shani
 Vishal Nayak as Agnidev 
 Preeti Chaudhary as Kritika
 Nimai Bali as Sage Ushana
 Chahat Pandey as Devasena 
 Shafaq Naaz as Vrinda 
 Chandni Bhagwanani as Behula 
 Reshmi Ghosh as Manasa / Mansa Devi 
 Amrita Prakash / Divyangana Jain as Mohini 
 Rohit Bakshi as Kamadeva / Bhandasura
 Vinita Joshi Thakkar as Devi Rati 
 Abhaas Mehta as Shumbha
  Danish Akhtar as Nishumbha
 Nirbhay Wadhwa as Mahishasura
 Kunal Bakshi as Andhakasura : Parvati and Shiva's Son.
 Sneha Namanandi as Daruka
 Dinesh Mehta as Narakasura 
Shilpa saklani as Diti

Production

Development

Actress Pooja Sharma also shared that it took nearly 3–4 hours for her to get painted in her Kali avatar. The set designs were different from other similar shows as the producer, Siddharth Tiwary, shared that he wanted the concept of the visualisation to be unique, and that the story would be blend of some fiction and stories from different Puranas.

Reception

Ratings
The show opened up with 6507 impressions and was the third most watched urban television show in its debut week in India.

The Times of India stated, "The show is a perfect blend of drama and mythology. Compared to the other shows, the VFX effects used in Mahakali are excellent and seeps one into the world of fantasy. Right from the backdrop setting to the costume drama, the make-believe looks convincing and draws you into its tale. The show has elaborate costumes and jewellery which make it furthermore engaging to watch."

Adaptation
It was dubbed in Tamil as Kaakum Deivam Kali on Colors Tamil. 
This show dubbed version of Bangla language with same title on Colors Bangala from 2017. 
This show remake in Kannada different actors same title on Colors Kannada  from 2018. 
This show dubbed in Telugu language with same title on Gemini TV. 
 This show dubbed in Malayalam language Sree Bhadrakali 16 April 2018 on Surya TV 
This show near running on 2020 on colors Rishtey

References

External links
 

Indian television series about Hindu deities
2017 Indian television series debuts
Colors TV original programming
2018 Indian television series endings
Swastik Productions television series